

O' 

 Joseph Leonard O'Brien b. 1895 first elected in 1940 as National Government member for Northumberland, New Brunswick.
 Lawrence D. O'Brien b. 1951 first elected in 1996 as Liberal member for Labrador, Newfoundland and Labrador.
 Pat O'Brien b. 1948 first elected in 1993 as Liberal member for London—Middlesex, Ontario.
 William Edward O'Brien b. 1831 first elected in 1882 as Conservative member for Muskoka and Parry Sound, Ontario.
 Jennifer O'Connell b. 1983 first elected in 2015 as Liberal member for Pickering—Uxbridge, Ontario.
 Martin Patrick O'Connell b. 1916 first elected in 1968 as Liberal member for Scarborough East, Ontario.
 Dennis James O'Connor b. 1886 first elected in 1930 as Liberal member for Châteauguay—Huntingdon, Quebec.
 Gordon O'Connor b. 1939 first elected in 2004 as Conservative member for Carleton—Lanark, Ontario.
 John O'Connor b. 1824 first elected in 1867 as Conservative member for Essex, Ontario.
 Terrance Patrick O'Connor b. 1940 first elected in 1972 as Progressive Conservative member for Halton, Ontario.
 John O'Donohoe b. 1824 first elected in 1874 as Liberal-Conservative member for Toronto East, Ontario.
 Raymond Joseph Michael O'Hurley b. 1909   first elected in 1957 as Progressive Conservative member for Lotbinière, Quebec.
 Joseph Phillip O'Keefe b. 1909 first elected in 1963 as Liberal member for St. John's East, Newfoundland and Labrador.
 Brian Alexander O'Kurley b. 1953 first elected in 1988 as Progressive Conservative member for Elk Island, Alberta.
 Clement Augustine O'Leary b. 1916 first elected in 1958 as Progressive Conservative member for Antigonish—Guysborough, Nova Scotia.
 Lawrence O'Neil b. 1954 first elected in 1984 as Progressive Conservative member for Cape Breton Highlands—Canso, Nova Scotia.
 John Raymond O'Neill b. 1891 first elected in 1925 as Conservative member for Timiskaming North, Ontario.
 Thomas James O'Neill b. 1882 first elected in 1935 as Liberal member for Kamloops, British Columbia.
 Tilly O'Neill-Gordon b. 1949 first elected in 2008 as Conservative member for Miramichi, New Brunswick.
 Seamus O'Regan b. 1971 first elected in 2015 as Liberal member for St. John's South—Mount Pearl, Newfoundland and Labrador. 
 James O'Reilly b. 1823 first elected in 1872 as Liberal-Conservative member for Renfrew South, Ontario.
 John Francis O'Reilly b. 1940 first elected in 1993 as Liberal member for Victoria—Haliburton, Ontario.
 Sean Patrick O'Sullivan b. 1952 first elected in 1972 as Progressive Conservative member for Hamilton—Wentworth, Ontario.
 Erin O'Toole b. 1973 first elected in 2012 as Conservative member for Durham, Ontario.

Oa 

 Edwin Randolph Oakes b. 1818 first elected in 1874 as Liberal-Conservative member for Digby, Nova Scotia.

Ob 

 Frank Oberle b. 1932 first elected in 1972 as Progressive Conservative member for Prince George—Peace River, British Columbia.
 Deepak Obhrai b. 1950 first elected in 1997 as Reform member for Calgary East, Alberta.

Od 

 Bev Oda b. 1944 first elected in 2004 as Conservative member for Clarington—Scugog—Uxbridge, Ontario.
 Edmond George Odette b. 1884 first elected in 1926 as Liberal member for Essex East, Ontario.

Og 

 Alfred Ogden b. 1843 first elected in 1878 as Conservative member for Guysborough, Nova Scotia.
 Robert Joseph Ogle b. 1928 first elected in 1979 as New Democratic Party member for Saskatoon East, Saskatchewan.

Ol 

 Harry Olaussen b. 1929 first elected in 1972 as New Democratic Party member for Coast Chilcotin, British Columbia.
 Rob Oliphant b. 1956 first elected in 2008 as Liberal member for Don Valley West, Ontario.
 Frank Oliver b. 1853 first elected in 1896 as Liberal member for Provisional District of Alberta, Northwest Territories.
 Joe Oliver b. 1940 first elected in 2011 as Conservative member for Eglinton—Lawrence, Ontario. 
 John Oliver b. 1956 first elected in 2015 as Liberal member for Oakville, Ontario. 
 Thomas Oliver b. 1821 first elected in 1867 as Liberal member for Oxford North, Ontario.
 Joseph Mario Jacques Olivier b. 1944 first elected in 1972 as Liberal member for Longueuil, Quebec.
 Louis Ephrem Olivier b. 1848 first elected in 1878 as Liberal member for Mégantic, Quebec.
 Horace Andrew Olson b. 1925 first elected in 1957 as Social Credit member for Medicine Hat, Alberta.

Oo 

 John Oostrom b. 1930 first elected in 1984 as Progressive Conservative member for Willowdale, Ontario.

Op
Ted Opitz b. 1961 first elected in 2011 as Conservative member for Etobicoke Centre, Ontario.

Or 

 Robert Orange b. 1926 first elected in 1965 as Liberal member for Northwest Territories, Northwest Territories.
 David Orlikow b. 1918 first elected in 1962 as New Democratic Party member for Winnipeg North, Manitoba.
 James Norris Ormiston b. 1915   first elected in 1958 as Progressive Conservative member for Melville, Saskatchewan.
 George Turner Orton b. 1837 first elected in 1874 as Liberal-Conservative member for Wellington Centre, Ontario.

Os 
 Edmund Boyd Osler b. 1845 first elected in 1896 as Conservative member for West Toronto, Ontario.
 Edmund Boyd Osler b. 1919 first elected in 1968 as Liberal member for Winnipeg South Centre, Manitoba.
 Marcel Ostiguy b. 1929 first elected in 1978 as Liberal member for Saint-Hyacinthe, Quebec.

Ot 

 Steven Otto b. 1921 first elected in 1962 as Liberal member for York East, Ontario.

Ou 

 André Ouellet b. 1939 first elected in 1967 as Liberal member for Papineau, Quebec.
 Christian Ouellet b. 1934 first elected in 2006 as Bloc Québécois member for Brome—Missisquoi, Quebec.
 David Ouellet b. 1908 first elected in 1962 as Social Credit member for Drummond—Arthabaska, Quebec.
 Gérard Ouellet b. 1913 first elected in 1963 as Social Credit member for Rimouski, Quebec.
 Robert-Falcon Ouellette b. 1976 first elected in 2015 as Liberal member for Winnipeg Centre, Manitoba. 
 Joseph-Aldric Ouimet b. 1848 first elected in 1873 as Liberal-Conservative member for Laval, Quebec.
 Joseph-Rodolphe Ouimet b. 1878 first elected in 1922 as Liberal member for Vaudreuil—Soulanges, Quebec.

Ow 

 Charles Lewis Owen b. 1852 first elected in 1907 as Conservative member for Northumberland East, Ontario.
 Stephen Owen b. 1948 first elected in 2000 as Liberal member for Vancouver Quadra, British Columbia.

O